The Gentleman from Nowhere is a 1948 American crime-drama film directed by William Castle.

Plot

Warner Baxter plays a security guard, wounded in a robbery of furs, who arouses the suspicions of an insurance investigator.  The guard may or may not be a chemist who has been missing for seven years, declared dead, and whose widow collected $200,000 on his insurance policy.

Cast

 Warner Baxter as Earl Donovan / Robert Ashton
 Fay Baker as Catherine Ashton
 Luis Van Rooten as F.B. Barton
 Charles Lane as Fenmore
 Wilton Graff as Larry Hendricks
 Grandon Rhodes as Edward Dixon
 Noel Madison as Vincent Sawyer
 unbilled players include Stanley Blystone, Selmer Jackson and Robert Emmett Keane

External links
 
 Turner Classic Movies page

1948 films
American black-and-white films
Columbia Pictures films
Films directed by William Castle
1948 crime drama films
American crime drama films
Films with screenplays by Edward Anhalt
1940s American films